Hu Ge (胡歌; born 1982) is a Chinese actor and singer.

Hu Ge may also refer to:

Hu Ge (director) (胡戈 1974), internet humorist and amateur director
Hu Ge (artist/director), founder of WAZA in China

See also
 Ge Hu (disambiguation)
 Huge (disambiguation)
 Hu (disambiguation)
 Ge (disambiguation)